Michael Thomas Richter (born September 22, 1966) is an American former professional ice hockey goaltender. He played his entire career with the New York Rangers organization, and led the team to the Stanley Cup in 1994. He also represented the United States in international play on several occasions. Richter was named to the U.S. Hockey Hall of Fame, alongside his former Rangers and U.S. teammate Brian Leetch, in 2008.

Playing career
Richter grew up in Flourtown, Pennsylvania, near Philadelphia, and idolized Philadelphia Flyers goaltender Bernie Parent. He attended and played for Germantown Academy in Fort Washington, Pennsylvania, and then Northwood School in Lake Placid, New York, graduating in 1985. He also played at the Wissahickon Skating Club.  After playing for the United States in the World Junior Championships in 1985, Richter played for the University of Wisconsin–Madison from 1985 to 1987, and the Rangers made him the 28th overall pick in the 1985 NHL Entry Draft. He again represented the US in the 1986 World Junior Championships, as well as the World Championships and the 1988 Winter Olympics in Calgary, before making his NHL debut in the 1989 playoffs. Though he lost the one game in which he played, he was soon a regular member of the Rangers, posting 12 wins against 5 losses in his rookie season as the club's backup goaltender. Over the next two seasons, Richter split goaltending duties with the Rangers' veteran starter, John Vanbiesbrouck, and was selected to play for the U.S. in the 1991 Canada Cup tournament.

Vanbiesbrouck was traded to the Vancouver Canucks prior to being selected by the Florida Panthers in the 1993-94 NHL expansion draft.  Richter then had his first campaign as the team's number one goaltender. He posted a career best 42 wins and 2.57 goals against average as the Rangers won the Presidents' Trophy as the league's top regular season team for the second time in three years. He was also named Most Valuable Player of the NHL All-Star Game, which the Rangers hosted at Madison Square Garden. In the playoffs, he ramped up his play, becoming the eighth goaltender to post four shutouts in one playoff season. The Rangers reached the Stanley Cup Finals against the Canucks, and Richter earned a career highlight in Game 4, famously stopping Vancouver sniper Pavel Bure on a penalty shot. The Rangers defeated the Canucks in seven games to win their first Stanley Cup since 1940.

Over the next few years, Richter would be consistently ranked among the world's top goaltenders. He led the United States to victory in the 1996 World Cup of Hockey, with his efforts earning him tournament Most Valuable Player honors.  Injuries plagued much of his career, including MCL sprains, ACL sprains, and concussions.

Richter's style of play was very acrobatic and quick.  For a small goalie he made himself look big by using his lightning quick reflexes to make saves. He was rarely out of position and always square to his shooters.  He was known for making plenty of desperation saves using his focus, flexibility, and athleticism. Longtime teammate and Hall of Fame Ranger defenseman Brian Leetch once said about Richter: "I have never seen anyone more focused than he was.  As the game got tougher, he got better.  If a goal was ever scored on him I was always surprised."

His last appearance in the Stanley Cup playoffs would be 1997, as a series of knee injuries and a string of mediocre Ranger teams saw his personal statistics suffer. Nevertheless, he was selected as the top goalie for Team USA in the 1998 and 2002 Olympics, winning a silver medal in the 2002 Games. 

Richter was selected by the Nashville Predators in the 1998 NHL Expansion Draft, but as a UFA chose to eventually return to the Rangers that summer.

On June 30, 2002, Richter's rights were traded to the Edmonton Oilers in exchange for future considerations. The Oilers were unable to sign Richter, and he returned to the Rangers on a new contract a few days later on July 4. A year later a skull fracture and concussion forced him to retire, but not until after he became the first Ranger to record 300 wins. He finished his career as the Rangers all-time leader in wins, later surpassed by Henrik Lundqvist.

Richter's jersey (#35) became the third number retired by the Rangers at Madison Square Garden on February 4, 2004. Though he played his entire career for the Rangers, he twice changed teams between seasons due to a quirk in the NHL rules of free agency, returning to the Rangers each time.

Post-retirement
In 2007 and 2009, Richter stated that he would be interested in running for Congress as a Democrat in either Connecticut's 4th congressional district or New York's 20th congressional district special election, 2009.

After retiring from the NHL, Richter enrolled in Yale University, entering through the highly competitive Eli Whitney Students Program, Yale College's admissions program for non-traditional students. He received his degree in Ethics, Politics, and Economics with a concentration in Environmental Policy (EP&E).

Richter is currently a founding partner at Healthy Planet Partners, a sustainable power finance and consulting group, and Environmental Capital Partners, a $100 million private equity fund focusing on resource efficiency. Richter serves on the board of directors for Riverkeeper, the Board of Trustees for the Adirondack Nature Conservancy, and sits as a member of the National Advisory Council for the Sierra Club. He recently began collaborating with the Natural Resources Defense Council (NRDC) in their effort to bring the best ecological practices to the sports industry.  He also launched Athletes for a Healthy Planet, an organization dedicated to fostering an understanding of the connections between environmental issues, human health, economy, social justice, and well-being.

He is the chairman of the Aspen Institute's Sport and Society Program dedicated to improving the quality and quantity of athletic participation in society, as well as the NHL Ambassador to Beyond Sport, an NGO chaired by Tony Blair, whose mission is to use the power of sport to promote social change. He is a member of the 2010 class of Aspen Institute Catto Environmental Fellows. On December 12, 2012, he participated in the 12–12–12 concert benefit, answering calls from viewers wishing to donate to victims of Hurricane Sandy.

During the 2013-14 hockey season, Let's Play Hockey newspaper and the Herb Brooks Foundation announced the creation of the Mike Richter Award to annually honor the most outstanding goaltender in NCAA men's hockey. The inaugural award was presented to Connor Hellebuyck of UMass Lowell at the 2014 NCAA Men's Frozen Four in Philadelphia.

Richter is scheduled to play in a UN Environment Programme-sponsored hockey game planned to be held near the North Pole. The idea for the game was conceived by Russian hockey legend Viacheslav Fetisov, and is intended to raise awareness of receding ice in polar regions due to climate change.

Richter has three sons, all of whom play ice hockey in their hometown of Greenwich, Connecticut.

Career statistics

Regular season and playoffs

International

Awards and honors

 3× NHL All-Star Game: 1992 NHL All-Star Game, 1994 NHL All-Star Game (MVP), 2000 NHL All-Star Game
 Stanley Cup champion: 1994
 Won gold medal at 1996 World Cup of Hockey (MVP)
 Won silver medal at 2002 Winter Olympics
 Number 35 jersey retired by the New York Rangers in 2004
 Inducted into the U.S. Hockey Hall of Fame in 2008
 Received the 2009 Lester Patrick Award alongside Mark Messier and Jim Devellano
 In the 2009 book 100 Ranger Greats, ranked No. 3 all-time of the 901 New York Rangers (and ranked highest of the 74 who were goaltenders) who had played during the team's first 82 seasons
 Inducted into the Philadelphia Sports Hall of Fame in 2014

Rangers' team awards
 Crumb Bum Award – "For service to New York youngsters" (1997)
 Frank Boucher Trophy – "Most popular player on and off the ice" (1991, 1999, 2000, 2002)
 Good Guy Award – "For cooperation with the media" (1991)
 Lars-Erik Sjoberg Award – "Best rookie of training camp" (1988)
 Player's Player Award (1991, 2000)
 Team Rookie of the Year (1991)
 Team MVP (2000, 2002)

Rangers' team records
 Career games played: 666
 Single season wins: 42 (1993–94)

References

External links
 
 U.S. Olympic Team bio

1966 births
Living people
American athlete-politicians
American men's ice hockey goaltenders
Binghamton Rangers players
Colorado Rangers players
Denver Rangers players
Germantown Academy alumni
Ice hockey players from Pennsylvania
Ice hockey players at the 1988 Winter Olympics
Ice hockey players at the 1998 Winter Olympics
Ice hockey players at the 2002 Winter Olympics
Lester Patrick Trophy recipients
Medalists at the 2002 Winter Olympics
National Hockey League All-Stars
National Hockey League players with retired numbers
New York (state) Democrats
New York Rangers draft picks
New York Rangers players
Olympic silver medalists for the United States in ice hockey
People from Abington Township, Montgomery County, Pennsylvania
Sierra Club people
Sportspeople from Montgomery County, Pennsylvania
Stanley Cup champions
United States Hockey Hall of Fame inductees
Wisconsin Badgers men's ice hockey players
Yale University alumni